Alice Lake (1895–1967) was an American film actress.

Alice Lake may also refer to:

 Alice Lake, a lake in Blue Earth County, Minnesota, U.S.
 Alice Lake Provincial Park, British Columbia, Canada
 Alice Lake (Sawtooth Wilderness), a lake in Blaine County, Idaho, U.S.

See also

Lake Alice (disambiguation)